Cheilotoma beldei is a species of leaf beetles from the subfamily of Cryptocephalinae that can be found in Jordan and Turkey. Cheilotoma beldei has the greatest resemblance to Cheilotoma musciformis.

References

External links
Wydział Nauk Biologicznych

Clytrini
Beetles described in 1984
Fauna of Jordan